Gelindo Bordin (born 2 April 1959) is an Italian former athlete, winner of the marathon race at the 1988 Summer Olympics. He is the first Italian to have won an Olympic gold in the marathon and the only male to win both the Boston Marathon and the Olympic gold medal in this event.

Biography
Born in Vicenza, Italy, Bordin made his first breakthrough at the 1986 European Championships, where he won a gold medal in the marathon. His next international competition was the 1987 World Championships in Rome. The marathon race was held on a very hot and humid day. Bordin wisely held back from the leaders in the early stages. He caught up with the leaders after the 35 km mark and finally managed to hold on to the third place, winning a bronze medal.

At the Olympic marathon in Seoul, Bordin stayed with the leaders from the start. After  the leading pack started to distance itself from the rest of the runners. With  remaining, only three runners remained: Bordin, Wakiihuri, the Kenyan and the Djiboutan, Salah. With  to go, Salah surged forward taking Wakihuri with him and establishing a comfortable gap between the two and Bordin. At this late stage of the race the move seemed a decisive one, leading most viewers and sport commentators to reasonably conclude that the gold and silver medals were to be decided between Wakihuri and Salah, with Bordin hopefully holding on to his bronze medal position. But Bordin's  sheer courage and determination gradually saw him lessen the gap and finally catch up with the leaders once again, much to the delight of the Italian commentators and fans who were now ecstatic.

Bordin successfully defended his European marathon title in 1990, becoming the first man to win the title twice, but at the 1991 World Championships in Tokyo, he finished in a disappointing eighth place. Bordin attempted to defend his Olympic title at 1992 Summer Olympics in Barcelona, but he strained a groin muscle jumping over a fallen runner just after the halfway mark, and failed to finish. Shortly after the 1992 Summer Olympics Bordin decided to retire.

Bordin is the only male to win both the Boston Marathon and an Olympic gold medal in the marathon. He won the Boston Marathon in 1990 and describes the victory as his "second greatest run, after winning the Olympics".

Achievements

See also
List of winners of the Boston Marathon
Italian all-time lists – Marathon
 FIDAL Hall of Fame

References

External links

1959 births
Living people
Sportspeople from Vicenza
Italian male long-distance runners
Italian male marathon runners
Olympic athletes of Italy
Olympic gold medalists for Italy
Athletes (track and field) at the 1988 Summer Olympics
Athletes (track and field) at the 1992 Summer Olympics
World Athletics Championships athletes for Italy
World Athletics Championships medalists
European Athletics Championships medalists
European athletics champions for Italy
Medalists at the 1988 Summer Olympics
Boston Marathon male winners
Olympic gold medalists in athletics (track and field)